Margaret Alice Cabourn-Smith (born 1975) is an English comedy actress with appearances on Catastrophe, The IT Crowd,  Psychoville, Peep Show and Fresh Meat.

Her TV work includes playing regular characters on Miranda, Katy Brand's Big Ass Show, Lab Rats, In and Out of The Kitchen and Father Figure.

She plays Crimson in Disney Channel's The Evermoor Chronicles

Her radio work includes many of The Penny Dreadfuls' plays, John Finnemore's Souvenir Programme. The Now Show, Sarah Millican's Support Group, The Maltby Collection, Bigipedia, Newsjack, Dilemma, Another Case of Milton Jones, Life in London, The Headset Set and 1966 and All That. She is also one of the team captains on the comedy podcast Do The Right Thing.

Stage work includes Angus, Thongs & Even More Snogging (West Yorkshire Playhouse 2012) and Gutted (Assembly Rooms, 2010)

She writes for online magazine Standard Issue. She is married to comedy writer and actor Dan Tetsell.

In July 2021 she appeared as Leyla in BBC Radio 4's The Archers.

Selected filmography
 Open Casket (2004)
 Comedy Cuts (2007)
 Peep Show (2008)
 Lab Rats (2008)
 LifeSpam: My Child is French (2009)
 Things Talk (2009)
 Psychoville (2009)
 Katy Brand's Big Ass Show (2007–2009)
 A Very British Cult (2009)
 Mongrels (2010)
 The Increasingly Poor Decisions of Todd Margaret (2010)
 The Bleak Old Shop of Stuff (2012)
 Fresh Meat (2012)
 Father Figure (2013)
 The IT Crowd (2010–2013)
 Miranda (2009–2014)
 In and Out of the Kitchen (2015)
 Catastrophe (2015)
 Lolly Adefopfe's Christmas (2015)
 Motherland (2016 - 2021)
 Morgana Robinson's The Agency (2016)
 Bucket (2017)
 Holby City (2017)
 The Evermoor Chronicles (2014–2017)
 The Hustle (2019)

References

External links

Living people
21st-century English actresses
English women comedians
1975 births
English stage actresses
English television actresses
English radio actresses
People from the London Borough of Richmond upon Thames
Date of birth missing (living people)